Andrew Thornton is a retired National Hunt jockey.

Early life
He was born on 28 October 1972 in Cleveland and schooled at Barnard Castle School in County Durham. He is not related to another English jockey, Robert Thornton.

Riding career
He rode mainly for Caroline Bailey and Seamus Mullins, he was stable jockey for Robert Alner for many years as well as riding for plenty of other trainers over the years. Thornton was one of the very few National Hunt jockeys who wore contact lenses while riding and it is for this reason that he acquired the nicknames "Lensio" and "Blindman". Thornton rode his 1000th winner on Kentford Myth at Wincanton on 26 December 2016.

Despite having to endure many setbacks and injuries throughout his career, by 2012 Thornton was widely regarded as one of the best jumps jockeys around. He was also very highly respected among his weighing room colleagues.

Because Thornton was taller than the average jump jockey, he was forced to ride very low in the stirrups. It was not always attractive to look at but it rarely failed to get the job done. The benefits of his riding style were also highlighted by the record Thornton had in staying handicap chases and staying handicap hurdle races. He was able to push along from a mile out and galvanise the horse. His strength was seen in many exciting finishes when he looked beaten turning for home.

On 6 June 2018, Thornton retired from racing.

Since retirement, Thornton has worked for Sky Sports Racing amongst others. The highlight of his broadcasting career coming on the 21st January 2022 when he made his first appearance on the channel’s flagship show, Get In. Presented by regular host Jason (Shark) Weaver and Mike  Cattermole. The 'Catt' was deputising for Luke Harvey (The Toxic Turtle).

Harvey was late for his own show, which was deemed a new low for the 'marmite' presenter. Thornton was asked about editing his own Wikipedia page and his questionable moustache in June 2009.

Notable horses
Thornton rode many horses including Cool Dawn, Gingembre and See More Business to victory in many a big race as well as 8-time winner French Holly who won two Grade 1s and only just failed to win the Champion Hurdle in 1999 when beaten by Istabraq. His death in a schooling accident in the Winter of 1999 was a major disappointment to Thornton.

Achievements and awards 
1996 Lester Award for special recognition
1997 Lester Award for special recognition
2003 Lester Award for jump ride of the year aboard Kingscliff
2007 Lester Award for jump ride of the year aboard Miko De beauchene
He rode major winners for Robert Alner, Seamus Mullins, Evan Williams, Ian Williams, Jamie Poulton, Paul Nicholls, Mary Reveley, John Spearing, Lavina Taylor, Ferdy Murphy and TA Forster.

Cheltenham Festival winners 
1996 William Hill Trophy Handicap Chase - Maamur
1998 Royal & SunAlliance Novices' Hurdle - French Holly
1998 Cheltenham Gold Cup - Cool Dawn

Grade 1 winners 
1997 King George VI Chase - See More Business
1998 Tolworth Hurdle - French Holly
1998 Royal & SunAlliance Novices' Hurdle - French Holly
1998 Cheltenham Gold Cup - Cool Dawn
1998 Christmas Hurdle - French Holly
2003 Finale Juvenile Hurdle - Sunray

Other notable winners 
1998 Rendlesham Hurdle - Buckhouse Boy
1998 Racing Post Chase - Super Tactics
2000 National Spirit Hurdle - Male-Ana-Moo
2001 Rendlesham Hurdle - Merry Masquerade
2001 Scottish Grand National - Gingembre
2002 Hennessy Gold Cup - Gingembre
2005 Reynoldstown Novices' Chase - Distant Thunder
2006 Cotswold Chase - See You Sometime
2007 Racing Post Chase - Simon
2007 Welsh National - Miko De Beauchene
2008 Red Square Vodka Gold Cup - Miko De Beauchene

See also
List of jockeys

References

External links
 BBC profile
 Andrew Thornton official website

1972 births
English jockeys
Lester Award winners
Living people
People educated at Barnard Castle School
Sportspeople from County Durham